Adventure A: Planet of Death is a text adventure from Artic Computing published for the ZX81 and 4K ZX80 in 1981. Releases followed for the ZX Spectrum (1982), Commodore 64 (1984), and Amstrad CPC (1985). The game was followed by Adventures B, C, D, E, F, G, and H.

Adventure A was re-released for iOS and Android.

Plot 
The player is stranded on an alien planet. The aim is to escape from this planet by finding his or her captured and disabled spaceship.

Reception 
Crash magazine wrote that the game was "good value", complimenting its tone as "atmospheric" and "chilling".

References

External links 
 

1980s interactive fiction
1981 video games
Amstrad CPC games
Artic Computing games
Commodore 64 games
Single-player video games
Video games developed in the United Kingdom
Video games set on fictional planets
ZX Spectrum games
ZX81 games